David Heaton (March 10, 1823 – June 25, 1870) was an American attorney and politician, a US Representative from North Carolina. He earlier was elected to the state senates of Ohio and Minnesota.

Early life and education
Heaton was born in Hamilton, Butler County, Ohio, March 10, 1823 to James Heaton (1779–1841) and Mary Morrell (1782–1871), migrants from the East. He completed preparatory studies and studied law as a legal apprentice. He was admitted to the bar.

Political career
After getting active in politics, Heaton was elected to the Ohio State Senate in 1855.

Two years later, he moved to St. Anthony Falls, Minnesota, where he entered politics. He was elected as a member of the Minnesota State Senate, serving 1858–1863.

During the American Civil War, in 1863 Heaton was appointed as a special agent of the United States Treasury Department and the United States depository in New Bern, North Carolina after Union troops occupied the area. A contraband camp was set up near the city to begin education of former slaves for independence. In 1864, he was offered the appointment as the Third Auditor of the Treasury but declined.

Heaton decided to stay in North Carolina, where he served as a member of its constitutional convention in 1867 under Reconstruction. When the state was readmitted to representation, he was elected as a Republican to the Fortieth Congress and  reelected to the Forty-first Congress, serving from July 15, 1868, until his death. He was chairman of the Committee on Coinage, Weights, and Measures (Forty-first Congress).

After his nomination as a Republican candidate for reelection to the Forty-second Congress, he died in Washington, D.C., on June 25, 1870.  His body was returned to New Bern, where he was interred in the National Cemetery.

See also

 40th United States Congress
 41st United States Congress
 List of United States Congress members who died in office (1790–1899)

References

External links
 

Republican Party Ohio state senators
Minnesota state senators
1823 births
1870 deaths
Politicians from New Bern, North Carolina
Republican Party members of the United States House of Representatives from North Carolina
19th-century American politicians